

History
Dartchery (a combination of darts and archery) was contested between 1960 to 1980. It only hosted one event in 1960 where there was a mixed open event.

Summary medal table

References

Dartchery